Owain Arthur (born 5 March 1983) is a Welsh actor, who rose to fame playing Francis Henshall in The National Theatre's production of One Man, Two Guvnors at the Theatre Royal Haymarket.

His early years were spent in Bangor, Wales, filming the S4C series Rownd a Rownd, whilst attending the performing arts school, Ysgol Glanaethwy. Arthur then trained at the Guildhall School of Music and Drama in London.

He has played many roles in the theatre including Romeo and Juliet for the Royal Shakespeare Company, Comedy of Errors at the Royal Exchange Theatre and Birdsong at the Comedy Theatre. He has also worked extensively in UK TV roles.

He also voiced Lofty in the 2018 video game Ni no Kuni II: Revenant Kingdom.

In 2022, he played the Dwarven Prince Durin IV in The Lord of the Rings: The Rings of Power series on Amazon Prime. Co-star Morfydd Clark mentioned enjoying speaking in Welsh on-set with Arthur and Trystan Gravelle.

References

External links

Welsh male stage actors
Living people
Welsh male television actors
Alumni of the Guildhall School of Music and Drama
1983 births
20th-century Welsh male actors
21st-century Welsh male actors
Welsh male video game actors
People from Bangor, Gwynedd